Myton is a city in Duchesne County, Utah, United States. Established in 1905, Myton had a population of 569 at the 2010 census.

Geography
Myton is located in eastern Duchesne County along U.S. Routes 40 and 191.

Myton is on the south side of the Duchesne River, an east-flowing tributary of the Green River.

Climate
According to the Köppen Climate Classification system, Myton has a semi-arid climate, abbreviated BSk on climate maps.

In 1974, Myton recorded a mere  of precipitation for the entire year, the record lowest for a calendar year in Utah, and the second-lowest figure ever recorded in the US outside the southwestern deserts.

Demographics

As of the census of 2000, there were 539 people, 163 households, and 131 families residing in the city. The population density was 536.2 people per square mile (206.0/km2). There were 189 housing units at an average density of 188.0 per square mile (72.3/km2). The racial makeup of the city was 77.55% White, 11.13% Native American, 0.74% Asian, 7.61% from other races, and 2.97% from two or more races. Hispanic or Latino of any race were 12.62% of the population.

There were 163 households, out of which 48.5% had children under the age of 18 living with them, 59.5% were married couples living together, 14.7% had a female householder with no husband present, and 19.6% were non-families. 14.7% of all households were made up of individuals, and 3.7% had someone living alone who was 65 years of age or older. The average household size was 3.31 and the average family size was 3.68.

In the city, the population was spread out, with 37.8% under the age of 18, 12.2% from 18 to 24, 23.6% from 25 to 44, 18.9% from 45 to 64, and 7.4% who were 65 years of age or older. The median age was 25 years. For every 100 females, there were 97.4 males. For every 100 females age 18 and over, there were 92.5 males.

The median income for a household in the city was $23,472, and the median income for a family was $25,500. Males had a median income of $26,500 versus $32,917 for females. The per capita income for the city was $8,678. About 32.6% of families and 38.4% of the population were below the poverty line, including 48.5% of those under age 18 and 8.9% of those age 65 or over.

Notable people
 Texas Rose Bascom (1922-1993), rodeo performer, trick roper, Hollywood actress, National Cowgirl Hall of Fame inductee, Utah Cowboy Hall of Fame inductee

Notes

References

External links

 City of Myton official website

Cities in Utah
Cities in Duchesne County, Utah
Populated places established in 1905
1905 establishments in Utah